Elections to the Philippine Legislature were held on June 6, 1922 pursuant to the Philippine Organic Act of 1902 which prescribed elections for every three years. Votes elected 90 members of the House of Representatives in the 1922 Philippine House of Representatives elections; and 24 members of the Senate in the 1922 Philippine Senate elections.

For something less uninformative, see also 1922 Philippine House of Representatives elections and 1922 Philippine Senate elections.

1922
1922 elections in Asia
1922 in the Philippines